Santa Elena Bay Management Marine Area, is a marine protected area in Costa Rica, managed under the Guanacaste Conservation Area, it was created in 2018 by decree 41171-MINAE.

References 

Nature reserves in Costa Rica
Protected areas established in 2018
2018 establishments in North America